Stegastes fasciolatus, commonly called the Hawaiian gregory, is a damselfish of the family Pomacentridae that is endemic to the Hawaiian Islands. It feeds on filamentous algae.

Distribution and habitat
Stegastes marginatus is endemic to Hawaii, where it is found on shallow seaward reefs particularly in areas with mild to moderate water movement. Although previously synonymized with S. fasciolatus, it is apparently distinct based on DNA and morphological study.

References

marginatus
Fish described in 1901